Albert James Bernays (1823–1892) was a chemist. He was the son of Dr. Adolphus Bernays (d. 22 December 1864), modern languages Professor at King's College, London.

Life
He was educated at King's College School, and studied chemistry with C. Remigius Fresenius, and afterwards with Justus Liebig at Giessen, where he graduated PhD.  His doctoral thesis was probably a paper on limonin, a bitter principle which he discovered in the pips of oranges and lemons (published in Buchner's Repertorium für die Pharmacie and abstracted in Liebig's Annalen, 1841, xl. 317).   In  1845 he began his career as an analyst and lecturer on chemistry in Derby, and became known for his interest in questions concerning food and hygiene.  In 1851 he served as a juror at the Great Exhibition.  In 1852, he published the first edition of Household Chemistry, a popular work, of which the fourth edition, published in 1862, was called The Science of Home Life, and the seventh edition, published in 1869, The Student's Chemistry.  In 1855 Bernays was appointed to the lectureship in chemistry at St Mary's Hospital, London; he resigned in 1860, and accepted a similar post at St. Thomas's Hospital, which he retained till his death. Bernays was also public analyst to St. Giles's, Camberwell, and St. Saviours, Southwark, was for many years chemist and analyst to the Kent Water Company, and sometime examiner to the Royal College of Physicians.  He died from bronchitis at Acre House, Brixton, on 5 January 1892, and was by his own desire cremated at Woking.

Bernays was a genial man and a capable and popular teacher; he took a great interest in social matters generally, and gave over a thousand free public lectures during his lifetime.  Besides the works mentioned above he published a small manual on food in 1876, an essay on The Moderate Use of Alcohol True Temperance, published in the Contemporary Review and reprinted with essays by others in The Alcohol Question, various editions of Notes for Students in Chemistry, and miscellaneous lectures on agricultural chemistry and other subjects. He also carried out investigations on the atmosphere of Cornish mines and on dangerous trades, and made inventions in water filtration.  He was a fellow of the Chemical Society and of the Institute of Chemistry.

Family
He married Ellen Labatt, daughter of Benjamin Evans; she died on 6 February 1901 (Times, 8 February 1901).

References

DNB references
These references are found in the DNB article referred to above.

External links
 

1823 births
1892 deaths
Fellows of the Chemical Society
People educated at King's College School, London
Place of birth missing
19th-century British chemists
Academics of King's College London